Woke Up Alone is a studio album by Canadian hip hop producer Factor. It was released on Fake Four Inc. in 2013.

Critical reception

Thomas Quinlan of Exclaim! gave the album a 9 out of 10, saying, "Factor's production sets the mood; the music is mostly slow and sad, aside from the few moments of hope that get something a little more uplifting." Steve Juon of RapReviews.com gave the album a 7.5 out of 10 and said, "the variety of contributors to Factor's vision makes this one of his most wholly enjoyable albums".

Track listing

References

External links
 

2013 albums
Fake Four Inc. albums
Alternative hip hop albums by Canadian artists
Factor (producer) albums